Úrkút Sportkör is a professional football club based in Úrkút, Veszprém County, Hungary. The club competes in the Veszprém county league.

Name changes
1928–?: Úrkúti Levente Egyesület
?-1949: Úrkúti Bányász Sport Egyesület
1949–1951: Úrkúti Tárna
1951–?: Úrkúti Bányász SK
?-1986: Úrkúti Bányász SC
1986: defunct
1993: reestablished
1993–present: Úrkúti Sportkör

External links
 Profile on Magyar Futball

References

Football clubs in Hungary
Association football clubs established in 1928
1928 establishments in Hungary